Phos usquamaris is a species of sea snail, a marine gastropod mollusk in the family Nassariidae, the true whelks and the like.

Description

Distribution
This marine species occurs on the Saya de Malha Bank (western Indian Ocean).

References

 Fraussen K. 2005. A new Antillophos (Gastropoda: Buccinidae) from Saya de Malha Bank (western Indian Ocean). Gloria Maris 44(6): 150-154
 Bouchet, P.; Fontaine, B. (2009). List of new marine species described between 2002-2006. Census of Marine Life.
 Dekkers A.M. & Dekker H. (2020). A new small Phos-like genus and species Microphos palogai (Gastropoda: Nassariidae: Photinae) from the Philippines. Gloria Maris. 59(3): 98-101

External links

Nassariidae
Gastropods described in 2005